Spy in Chancery is a spy novel by Kenneth Benton set in Rome during the Cold War in the 1970s. The book begins with a foreword by novelist Michael Gilbert, and is the third novel to feature Overseas Police Adviser Peter Craig. Craig travels to Rome for a conference, and is caught up in investigating a spy at the British Embassy.

Plot summary
The novel begins in Paris, as an MI6 officer prepares to meet a would-be Soviet defector. The meeting turns sour and the MI6 man is murdered after learning that the KGB have a mole in the British Embassy in Rome, but his killers do not realise that a concealed microphone has recorded everything.

Craig, in Rome for a security conference, is briefed by MI6 to investigate the Embassy and find the mole. Craig interviews the main suspects, Adams, Ransome and Warren, and discovers that all have motive as well as opportunity to work with the Russians.

Craig meets Ashbee to coordinate his investigation with the CIA, who tells him about the illegal Soviet residency in Rome. Sir Watkyn volunteers to send false messages, implying that MI6 is blackmailing the Russian Ambassador, in order to lure out the spy. The KGB abduct Ashbee, blaming the Roman mafia for the kidnapping. With Kahn's help, Craig approaches the Roman mafia and convinces them that the KGB has set them up and caused the CIA to investigate them. With the help of the mafia, Craig rescues Ashbee and captures the KGB agents.

Still needing to find the source of the Embassy leaks, Craig allows Zakharov to escape and follows him to discover the mole.

Characters in "Spy in Chancery"
Peter Craig – protagonist; international police advisor for Her Majesty's Government
Sir Watkyn Rees – British Ambassador in Rome
Neil Adams – Embassy Scientific Officer
John Bracken – Head of Chancery
Diana Warren – his secretary
Janet Ransome – PA to the Ambassador
Jo Ashbee – Head of CIA mission, Rome
Luigi Kahn – Italian/Russian surveillance agent
Vishinsky – Russian Ambassador to Rome
Zakharov – KGB agent

References

External links
Section from Craig Thrillers website on Spy in Chancery

1972 British novels
Cold War spy novels
Novels set in Rome
William Collins, Sons books